Salassa is a comune (municipality) in the Metropolitan City of Turin in the Italian region Piedmont, located about  north of Turin in the Canavese traditional region.

Main sights
 13th-century cylindrical (with rectangular base) tower-gate, standing at 24 m.  
 Parish church of St. John the Baptist, in late Baroque-Neoclassical style.

External links
 Official website

Cities and towns in Piedmont
Canavese